Barakani is a village on the island of Moheli in the Comoros. According to the 1991 census the village had a population of 694.

References

Populated places in Mohéli